Klatretøsen is a 2002 Danish crime comedy film directed by . A remake from this Danish blockbuster was made in 2004 with the name Catch That Kid. The film's tagline is "The gutsiest girl since Pippi Longstocking."

Klatretøsen was produced by Nimbus Film.

Plot 
Ida, with help from her two best friends Sebastian and Jonas, robs the bank where her mother works, to get the money to save her dying father. During the heist, the kids overcome high-tech security systems, guard dogs, and a nasty head of security to get to a bank vault suspended 100 feet off the ground.

Cast 
  as Ida Johansen
  as Sebastian Klausen
 Mads Ravn as Jonas Balgaard
 William Haugaard Petersen as William Johansen
 Lars Bom as Klaus Johansen – Ida's father
  as Maria Johansen – Ida's mother
 Anders W. Berthelsen as Henrik (guard)
 Casper Jexlev Fomsgaard as Johnny Klausen
  as Hartmann

Reception 
The film has been recognised as "a good film for kids" and "all good fun".

Accolades 
The film won the Starboy award for the best children's film at Oulu International Children's and Youth Film Festival in 2002. It won the Robert Award for Best Children's Film at the 2003 Robert Awards.

References

External links 
 
 

2000s adventure films
2000s heist films
2002 films
Danish teen films
2000s Danish-language films
Nimbus Film films